The OFC–CAF play-off of the 2000 Olympic Football Tournament qualification competition was a two-legged tie that decided one spot in the 2000 Olympic football tournament in Sydney. The play-off was contested by the winners from the OFC, New Zealand, and the fourth-ranked team from CAF, South Africa.

South Africa won the tie 4–2 on aggregate to qualify for the 2000 Summer Olympics, emerging victorious in both matches with a 3–2 score in the first leg in Auckland and 1–0 in the second leg in Johannesburg.

Qualified teams

Summary
|}

Matches

South Africa won 4–2 on aggregate and qualified for the 2000 Summer Olympics.

Goalscorers

References

External links
 Traditional Rivalries Maintained In Thrilling Encounter at UltimateNZSoccer.com

Play-off
May 2000 sports events in New Zealand
May 2000 sports events in Africa
1999–2000 in OFC football
2000 in African football
2000 in New Zealand association football
1999–2000 in South African soccer
Sports competitions in Auckland
2000s in Auckland
Sports competitions in Johannesburg
2000s in Johannesburg
International association football competitions hosted by New Zealand
International association football competitions hosted by South Africa
Association football in Auckland